For Aunt Louise is an album by David Murray which was recorded for the Japanese DIW label in 1993 and released in 1995. It features performances by Murray, John Hicks, Fred Hopkins, and Idris Muhammad.

Reception
The Allmusic review by Al Campbell awarded the album 3 stars stating "While Murray still produces exciting flashes of furious free jazz tenor, he reins in his avant garde leanings, playing in an overall melodic yet bluesy style.".

Track listing
All compositions by David Murray except as indicated  
 "Fantasy Rainbow" - 10:42
 "Hicks' Time (Hicks) - 10:04
 "Asiatic Raes" (Dorham) - 7:38
 "Fishin' and Missin' You - For Aunt Louise" - 8:11
 "Boogie Real Slow" (Traditional) - 7:44
 "Autumn of the Patriarch - For Fred Hackett" -  8:55
 "Concion de Amour en Espanol" (Brian Smith) - 12:11

Personnel
David Murray - tenor saxophone, bass clarinet
John Hicks - piano
Fred Hopkins - bass
Idris Muhammad - drums

References 

1995 albums
David Murray (saxophonist) albums
DIW Records albums